Langlo is a surname. Notable people with the surname include:

Jenny Langlo (born 1993), Norwegian singer
Kaare Langlo (1913–1985), Norwegian meteorologist
Kristian Langlo (1894–1976), Norwegian politician 
Oddbjørn Sverre Langlo (1935–2004), Norwegian politician

Norwegian-language surnames